Barton is an unincorporated community in Clackamas County, Oregon, United States, on Oregon Route 224 near the Clackamas River.

Barton was named after Barton, Wisconsin by settler E. H. Burghardt. Burghardt started a flour mill and store near the mouth of Deep Creek, and later was postmaster of the Barton post office, which ran from 1896 to 1935.

References

Portland metropolitan area
Unincorporated communities in Clackamas County, Oregon
1896 establishments in Oregon
Populated places established in 1896
Unincorporated communities in Oregon